Kossaki-Falki  is a village in the administrative district of Gmina Rutki, within Zambrów County, Podlaskie Voivodeship, in north-eastern Poland.

The village has a population of 80.

References

Kossaki-Falki